Calliostoma duricastellum is a species of sea snail, a marine gastropod mollusk in the family Calliostomatidae.

References

External links
 To Biodiversity Heritage Library (3 publications)
 To World Register of Marine Species

duricastellum
Gastropods described in 1898